The athletics competition in the 1986 Central American and Caribbean Games were held in Santiago de los Caballeros, Dominican Republic.

Medal summary

Men's events

Women's events

Medal table

References

 
 
 

1986 Central American and Caribbean Games
Athletics at the Central American and Caribbean Games
C